Shinsha is the Japanese term for "company". It is incorporated into several names:

 Akane Shinsha, a manga publisher
 Chuokoron-Shinsha, a novel publisher
 Tōkyō Movie Shinsha (TMS), a film publisher

See also 
 Shisha bar